Gloria Dickson (born Thais Alalia Dickerson; August 13, 1917 – April 10, 1945) was an American stage and screen actress of the 1930s and 1940s.

Early years
Born in Pocatello, Idaho, Dickson was the daughter of a banker. After her father's death in 1929, the family moved to California. She graduated from Long Beach Polytechnic High School.

She began acting during high school in amateur theatre productions. Encouraged by her acting coaches, she moonlighted doing dramatic readings at social clubs and on KFOX radio station in Long Beach, California.

Career
In April 1936, as she worked in a production of the Federal Theatre Project, she was spotted by Warner Bros. talent scout Max Arnow, who signed her to a contract. Her film debut in 1937's They Won't Forget landed her on the top of Hollywood's short list of important up-and-comers, a distinction that garnered her enormous publicity. In autumn 1937, she was on many magazine covers and was the subject of several major movie magazine articles, with titles such as The Luckiest Girl in the World and New Star of the Year.

Personal life
Dickson married Perc Westmore on June 20, 1938, in Santa Barbara, California. She filed suit for divorce from him on May 17, 1940. The uncontested divorce was granted June 22, 1941, in Los Angeles, California. Her second marriage was to director Ralph Murphy, whom she divorced in 1944. Later in 1944, she married William Fitzgerald, a former boxer.

Death
Dickson died during a fire April 10, 1945, at the Los Angeles home she was renting from actor Sidney Toler, caused by an unextinguished cigarette that ignited an overstuffed chair on the main floor, while she slept upstairs. Her body, and that of her pet dog, were found in the bathroom, and  she is assumed to have attempted to escape through the bathroom window. She died from asphyxiation; flames had seared her lungs, and her body had suffered first- and second-degree burns. She is buried at Hollywood Forever Cemetery.

Partial filmography

 They Won't Forget (1937) - Sybil Hale
 Talent Scout (1937) - Blonde on Bus (uncredited)
 Gold Diggers in Paris (1938) - Mona Verdivere
 Racket Busters (1938) - Nora Jordan
 Secrets of an Actress (1938) - Carla Orr
 Heart of the North (1938) - Joyce MacMillan
 They Made Me a Criminal (1939) - Peggy
 Waterfront (1939) - Ann Stacey
 The Cowboy Quarterback (1939) - Evelyn Corey
 No Place to Go (1939) - Gertrude Plummer
 On Your Toes (1939) - Peggy Porterfield
 Private Detective (1939) - Mona Lannon
 King of the Lumberjacks (1940) - Tina Martin Deribault
 Tear Gas Squad (1940) - Jerry Sullivan
 I Want a Divorce (1940) - Wanda Holland
 This Thing Called Love (1940) - Florence Bertrand
 The Big Boss (1941) - Sue Peters
 Mercy Island (1941) - Leslie Ramsey
 The Affairs of Jimmy Valentine (1942) - Cleo Arden
 Power of the Press (1943) - Edwina Stephens
 Lady of Burlesque (1943) - Dolly Baxter
 The Crime Doctor's Strangest Case (1943) - Mrs. Keppler / Evelyn Fenton Cartwright
 Rationing (1944) - Miss McCue (final film role)

Stage credits
 Wise Tomorrow  (1937)

References

External links

Gloria Dickson, We Won't Forget: Essay by Dan Van Neste

1917 births
1945 deaths
Actresses from Idaho
People from Pocatello, Idaho
American film actresses
Deaths from fire in the United States
Burials at Hollywood Forever Cemetery
Accidental deaths in California
Deaths by smoke inhalation
20th-century American actresses
Long Beach Polytechnic High School alumni
Federal Theatre Project people